The Nobel Prizes and the Nobel Memorial Prize in Economic Sciences, which began in 1969, is a set of award based on Alfred Nobel's will given to "those who, during the preceding year, have conferred the greatest benefit to mankind." Since 1901, the prestigious Swedish Prize have been awarded 609 times to 975 people and 27 organizations including a Vietnamese diplomat.

The first and only Vietnamese Nobel laureate was Lê Đức Thọ when he was awarded the 1973 Nobel Peace Prize jointly with Henry Kissinger. But, Tho rejected the awarded claiming "peace has nod yet really been established in South Vietnam."

Laureates

Recognized laureates

Members of laureate organizations
The following Vietnam-based organizations are members of a larger organization that are Nobel laureates.

Nominations

Nominees
Since 1967, Vietnamese citizens started receiving nominations for the prestigious Swedish Prize in any category. The following list are the nominees with verified nominations from the Nobel Committee and recognized international organizations. There are also other purported nominees whose nominations are yet to be verified since the archives are revealed 50 years after, among them Nguyễn Chí Thiện (for Literature), Nguyễn Quang Hồng (for Literature), Xuân Diệu (for Literature), Bảo Ninh (for Literature), Kim Thúy (for Literature), Đàm Thanh Sơn (for Physics), Minh-Quảng Trần (for Physics), Trần Thanh Vân (for Physics), Cardinal Nguyễn Văn Thuận (for Peace), 2013 convicted Vietnamese dissidents (for Peace), Amanda Nguyen (for Peace), Lê Công Định (for Peace) and Phạm Đoan Trang (for Peace).

Notes

References

Lists of Nobel laureates by nationality